Forty Hadith, arbaʿīniyyāt is a subgenre of the Hadith literature. As the name indicates, these are collections containing forty hadith related to one or more subjects depending on the purpose of the compiler. The best-known example is by far Imam Nawawi's Forty Hadith, aiming to include all the fundamentals of the sacred Islamic law.

References

External links
 Forty Hadith Nawawi – English and Arabic.
 Translation of Imam An-Nawawi's Forty Hadiths.
 Forty Hadith al-Nawawi in English and Arabic (hadith qudsi)
 40 Hadith Nawawi by the Muslim American Society.
 An Exposition on 40 Ahadith by Imam Ruhullah al-Musawi al-Khumayni (Shia).
 Turath Publishing's series “Collections of Forty Hadiths”.

Islamic literature